BlazBlue Alter Memory is a Japanese anime television series based on the video game series BlazBlue. It aired on October 8, 2013. Funimation has licensed the anime for streaming and home video release in North America.

Plot
In 2199, humanity eagerly waits for the dawn of the new century, after ending a series of devastating magical war. Word spreads that Ragna the Bloodedge, an SS-class rebel with the highest ever bounty and a powerful form of Ars Magus known as the "Azure Grimoire", has appeared in the 13th Hierarchical City of Kagutsuchi. To collect the bounty, a motley array of fighters converge on Kagutsuchi.

Characters

A wanted criminal with an extraordinarily large bounty on his head (well in the trillions) for attempting to destroy the Novus Orbis Librarium, and is Jin and Saya's older brother. His prosthetic arm contains the powerful "Azure Grimoire" (BlazBlue). 

A former Major and 4th Thaumaturgist Squadron Commander of the Novus Orbis Librarium, and Ragna and Saya's brother. He wields the Nox Nyctores "Mucro Algesco: Yukianesa" sword.

/

A former lieutenant of the Novus Orbis Librarium who was assigned to return the AWOL Jin Kisaragi to his post. In reality, she's a Murakumo Unit known as Mu-12. She wields the Nox Nyctores "Arcus Diabolus: Bolverk" revolvers.

The head of the Alucard vampire clan and the current owner of the "Tsukuyomi Unit".

Rachel's black transmogrifying cat speaking and acting snobbishly. He is often seen in umbrella form but he morphs into and be used as either a Lobelia (bat lance) cannon or a comfy chair.

Rachel's stout red bat familiar. He is often burdened by Rachel's orders during teatime, or her fits wherein she has the penchant of either using him as a footrest or pinching his cheek.

A respectful warrior of the Kaka clan, who befriends Ragna to secure a new home-land for the clan.

A Sector Seven professor who has been mechanically enhanced to perform field-work.

One of the Six Heroes who defeated the Black Beast. In truth, Hakumen is Jin's future self, whose soul was bound to the Susano'o unit after falling into the Gates of Sheol and saved by Rachel.

The childhood friend of Jin, Noel, Carl and Makoto. She is the former roommate of the Military Academy and a major of the non-official Novus Orbis Librarium's Zero Squadron.

/ 

The captain of Novus Orbis Librarium's Intelligence Department. In reality, his real name is Yuki Terumi, a former member of the Six Heroes who betrayed them, and the one whom responsible for kidnapping Saya and had Jin being possessed by Yukianesa. 

A former classmate of Tsubaki Yayoi, Carl Clover, Noel Vermillion, and Jin Kisaragi from the Military Academy. She is a squirrel beastkin.

Rachel's servant and one of the Six Heroes with a wolf beastkin.

The father of Carl and Ada, and the husband of Ignis.

A scientist of Sector Seven, and the daughter of Jubei and Nine.

Also known as Mitsuyoshi, he is one of the Six Heroes and Ragna's master who battled the Black Beast alongside Hakumen. He is a cat beastkin.

Litchi's clinic assistant.

The younger sister of Jin and Ragna. She was born with a frail body, and throughout her life, she was bullied by her brother Jin. Her other brother, Ragna, was much more caring, spent much time with her. Jin grew jealous of the relationship Ragna and Saya shared, and eventually attempted to kill her, immediately after she gave Jin the Nox Nyctores, Yukianesa. She is somehow possessed by an entity known as Izanami and was kidnapped by Yūki Terumi that day, and being given unconscious to Relius Clover under Izanami's order.

The imperator of the NOL. She had Hazama and Relius kidnap Saya and made her a vessel.

Episode list
{|class="wikitable" style="width:98%; margin:auto; background:#FFF;"
|- style="border-bottom: 3px solid #CCF;"
! style="width:3em;"  | No.
! Title
! style="width:12em;" | Original airdate
|-

|}

References

External links
 

2013 anime television series debuts
2013 Japanese television series debuts
2013 Japanese television series endings
Anime television series based on video games
BlazBlue
Funimation
Hoods Entertainment
Japanese adult animated science fiction television series
Television series set in the 22nd century
Tokyo MX original programming